Michael Hormillosa (born 18 June 1968) is a Filipino boxer. He competed in the men's bantamweight event at the 1988 Summer Olympics.

References

1968 births
Living people
Filipino male boxers
Olympic boxers of the Philippines
Boxers at the 1988 Summer Olympics
Place of birth missing (living people)
Bantamweight boxers